Galgalia is a village in Kishanganj District, Bihar state, India.

Transport
Galagalia railway station is situated on the Katihar-Siliguri Line of Indian Railways.

There is a customs post on the border with Nepal's Jhapa District, Mechi Zone leading to Bhadrapur municipality.  Citizens of India and Nepal cross this border freely. The foundation stone for a bridge across the Mechi River to Bhadrapur was laid in 2010. It is being built by the Government of Nepal.

References

Villages in Kishanganj district
Transit and customs posts along the India–Nepal border